The 1949–50 IHL season was the fifth season of the International Hockey League, a North American minor professional league. Five teams participated in the regular season, and the Chatham Maroons won the Turner Cup.

Regular season

Turner Cup-Playoffs

External links
 Season 1949/50 on hockeydb.com

IHL
IHL
International Hockey League (1945–2001) seasons